Ricardo Baeza may refer to:
Ricardo Baeza-Yates (born 1961), Chilean computer scientist
Ricardo Baeza Rodríguez, Chilean mathematician